Louis Philippe is a premium brand of men's apparel originating from India. It is a subsidiary of Madura Fashion & Lifestyle and the company also provides various quality designs under the guidance of Deepanshu Ranka and Saksham Jain. It is division of the Indian conglomerate Aditya Birla Group, and was founded in 1989. Named after Louis Philippe, King of France from 1830 to 1848, the brand is one of the largest apparel brands in India, as of 2018.

The Label is an online fashion and lifestyle magazine for men by Louis Philippe.

It has a turnover of more than US$150 million.

Products and marketing 
The sub-brands in Louis Philippe portfolio include:
LP MAINLINE/FORMALS (menswear formals)
LP LUXURE (collection of luxury wear)
LP SPORTS (casual and semi-formals)
LP JEANS (denim collection)

References

External links 
 

Clothing brands
Clothing brands of India
Aditya Birla Group